Jiwan Kumar Parajuli (Nepali: जिवन पराजुली) is a Nepali entertainment journalist and author. He was born in Parbat District.

Parajuli started his journalism career at Radio Upatyaka in 2007. He became active entertainment journalism in Nepal. He is an author of Close-Up (Nepali Book), a book about the Nepali film industry. He has been awarded from Press Council Beat Journalism Award 2022, which was given by Press Council Nepal. Similarly, he has also received ‘Excellence in Entertainment Journalism Award 2021’ in PIM Nepal Film Festival. He is the immediate past vice president of Film Journalist Association Nepal and National Delphic Council Nepal.

References 

Living people
Nepalese journalists
People from Parbat District
Nepalese writers
Nepalese film people
Year of birth missing (living people)